Mark Patterson may refer to:

 Mark Patterson (Australian cricketer) (born 1966), Australian cricketer
 Mark Patterson (Irish cricketer) (born 1974), former Irish cricketer
 Mark Patterson (field hockey) (born 1969), Indian Olympic hockey player
 Mark Patterson (footballer, born 1965), former Bolton Wanderers, Blackburn Rovers, Preston North End and Bury player, later manager of Scarborough
 Mark Patterson (footballer, born 1968), former Plymouth Argyle and Gillingham player
 Mark Patterson (investor), private equity and hedge fund investor who co-founded MatlinPatterson Global Advisors, and a racing driver
 Mark Patterson (Idaho politician), American politician in the Idaho House of Representatives
 Mark Patterson (New Zealand politician), member of the New Zealand House of Representatives
 Mark A. Patterson, American lobbyist and Chief of Staff to the Secretary of the Treasury (2009–)

See also
 Mark Paterson (disambiguation)
Mark Pattison (disambiguation)